Durmuş Ali Demir (born March 10, 1967) is a Turkish theoretical physicist at Sabancı University since 2019. He was a dean of the Graduate School of Engineering and Sciences at the Izmir Institute of Technology where he was the ex-chair of the Physics Department. His research areas include supersymmetric standard model, extra dimensions and general relativity.

Awards

 2009 - Full Member, TWAS
 2006 - The Humboldt Prize (Alexander von Humboldt Foundation Prize)
 2005 - TUBITAK Young Scientist Prize
 2004 - TUBA Young Scientist Prize
 2001 - TGC Sedat Simavi Science Award
 1997 - METU Parlar Foundation Encouragement Award

Notable publications
 
 
 Complete list at SPIRES

References

External links
 http://www.ipm.ac.ir/Visitorpage.jsp?VisitsCode=EP0500013

Turkish non-fiction writers
Turkish physicists
Middle East Technical University alumni
Living people
1967 births
Theoretical physicists